The Battle of Long Island, also known as the Battle of Brooklyn and the Battle of Brooklyn Heights, was an action of the American Revolutionary War fought on August 27, 1776, at the western edge of Long Island in present-day Brooklyn, New York. The British defeated the Americans and gained access to the strategically important Port of New York, which they held for the rest of the war. It was the first major battle to take place after the United States declared its independence on July 4, and in troop deployment and combat, it was the largest battle of the war.

After defeating the British in the siege of Boston on March 17, commander-in-chief George Washington relocated the Continental Army to defend the port city of New York, located at the southern end of Manhattan Island. Washington understood that the city's harbor would provide an excellent base for the Royal Navy, so he established defenses there and waited for the British to attack. In July, the British, under the command of General William Howe, landed a few miles across the harbor on the sparsely populated Staten Island, where they were reinforced by a fleet of ships in Lower New York Bay over the next month and a half, bringing their total force to 32,000 troops. Washington knew the difficulty in holding the city with the British fleet in control of the entrance to the harbor at the Narrows, and accordingly moved the bulk of his forces to Manhattan, believing that it would be the first target.

On August 21, the British landed on the shores of Gravesend Bay in southwest Kings County, across the Narrows from Staten Island and more than a dozen miles south of the established East River crossings to Manhattan. After five days of waiting, the British attacked the American defenses on the Guan Heights. Unknown to the Americans, however, Howe had brought his main army around their rear and attacked their flank soon after. The Americans panicked, resulting in twenty percent losses through casualties and capture, although a stand by 400 Maryland and Delaware troops prevented greater losses. The remainder of the army retreated to the main defenses on Brooklyn Heights. The British dug in for a siege, but on the night of August 29–30, Washington evacuated the entire army to Manhattan without the loss of supplies or a single life. The Continental Army was driven out of Manhattan entirely after several more defeats and was forced to retreat through New Jersey to Pennsylvania.

Prelude to battle
In the first stage of the war, the British Army was trapped in the peninsular city of Boston and were forced to abandon it on March 17, sailing to Halifax, Nova Scotia, to await reinforcements. Washington then began to transfer regiments to New York City, which he believed the British would attack next because of the port's strategic importance. He had sent his second-in-command, Charles Lee, ahead to New York the previous February to establish the city's defenses. Washington left Boston on April 4, arrived in New York on April 13, and established headquarters at the former home of Archibald Kennedy on Broadway facing Bowling Green. 

Lee remained in New York City until March when the Continental Congress sent him to South Carolina; construction of the city's defenses was left to General William Alexander (Lord Stirling). Troops were in limited supply, so Washington found the defenses incomplete, but Lee had concluded that in any case, it would be impossible to hold the city with the British commanding the sea. He reasoned that the defenses should be located with the ability to inflict heavy casualties upon the British if any move was made to take and hold ground. Barricades and redoubts were established in and around the city, and the bastion of Fort Stirling was built across the East River in Brooklyn Heights, facing the city. Lee had also seen to it that the immediate area was cleared of Loyalists.

Strategy

Washington began moving troops to Brooklyn in early May, and there were several thousand of them there in a short time. Three more forts were under construction on the eastern side of the East River to support Fort Stirling, which stood to the west of the hamlet of Brooklyn Heights. These new fortifications were Fort Putnam, Fort Greene, and Fort Box (named for Major Daniel Box). They lay from north to south, with Fort Putnam farthest to the north, Greene slightly to the southwest, and Box slightly farther southwest. Each of these defensive structures was surrounded by a large ditch, all connected by a line of entrenchments and a total of 36 cannons.

Fort Defiance was also being constructed at this time, located farther southwest, past Fort Box, near present-day Red Hook. In addition to these new forts, a mounted battery was established on Governors Island, on Manhattan, cannons were placed at Fort George facing Bowling Green, and more cannons were placed at the Whitehall Dock, which sat on the East River. Hulks were sunk at strategic locations to deter the British from entering the East River and other waterways.

Washington had been authorized by Congress to recruit an army of up to 28,501 troops, but he had only 19,000 when he reached New York. Military discipline was inadequate; routine orders were not carried out, muskets were fired in camp, flints was ruined, bayonets were used as knives to cut food, and firearm readiness was lax. Petty internal conflict was common under the strain of a large number of people from different regional cultures and temperaments living in relatively close proximity.

Commander of the artillery Henry Knox persuaded Washington to transfer 400 to 500 soldiers, who lacked muskets or guns, to crew the artillery. In early June, Knox and General Nathanael Greene inspected the land at the north end of Manhattan and decided to establish Fort Washington. Fort Constitution, later renamed Fort Lee, was planned opposite Fort Washington on the Hudson River. The forts were intended to discourage the British ships from sailing up the Hudson River.

British arrival

On June 28, Washington learned that the British fleet had set sail from Halifax on June 9 and was heading toward New York. On June 29, signals were sent from men stationed on Staten Island, indicating that the British fleet had appeared. Within a few hours, 45 British ships dropped anchor in Lower New York Bay. The population of New York went into a panic at the sight of the British ships; alarms went off and troops immediately rushed to their posts. On July 2, British troops began to land on Staten Island. The Continental regulars on the island took a few shots at them before fleeing, and the citizens' militia switched over to the British side. Less than a week later, there were 130 ships off Staten Island under the command of Richard Howe, the brother of General Howe.

On July 6, news reached New York that Congress had voted for independence four days earlier. On Tuesday, July 9, at 18:00, Washington had several brigades march onto the commons of the city to hear the Declaration of Independence read. After the end of the reading, a mob ran down to Bowling Green with ropes and bars, where they tore down the gilded lead equestrian statue of George III of Great Britain. In their fury, the crowd cut off the statue's head, severed the nose, mounted what remained of the head on a spike outside a tavern, and the rest of the statue was dragged to Connecticut and melted down into musket balls.

On July 12, the British ships Phoenix and  Rose sailed up the harbor toward the mouth of the Hudson. The American batteries opened fire from the harbor defenses of Fort George, Fort Defiance, and Governors Island, but the British returned fire into the city. The ships sailed along the New Jersey shore and continued up the Hudson, sailing past Fort Washington and arriving by nightfall at Tarrytown, the widest part of the Hudson. The goals of the British ships were to cut off American supplies from New England and the north and to encourage Loyalist support. The only casualties of the day were six Americans who were killed when their own cannon blew up.

The next day, July 13, Howe attempted to open negotiations with the Americans. He sent a letter to Washington delivered by Lieutenant Philip Brown, who arrived under a flag of truce. The letter was addressed to "George Washington, Esq." Brown was met by Joseph Reed, who had hurried to the waterfront on Washington's orders, accompanied by Henry Knox and Samuel Webb. Washington asked his officers whether it should be received or not, as it did not recognize his rank as general, and they unanimously said no. Reed told Brown that there was no one in the army with that address. On July 16, Howe tried again, this time with the address "George Washington, Esq., etc., etc.", but it was again declined. The next day, Howe sent Captain Nisbet Balfour to ask if Washington would meet with Howe's adjutant face to face, and a meeting was scheduled for July 20. Howe's adjutant was Colonel James Patterson. Patterson told Washington that Howe had come with powers to grant pardons, but Washington said, "Those who have committed no fault want no pardon." Patterson departed soon after. Washington's performance during the meeting was praised in many parts of the country.

Meanwhile, British ships continued to arrive. On August 1, 45 ships arrived with generals Henry Clinton and Charles Cornwallis, along with 3,000 troops. By August 12, 3,000 more British troops and another 8,000 Hessians had arrived. At this point, the British fleet numbered over 400 ships, including 73 warships, and 32,000 troops were camped on Staten Island. Faced with this large force, Washington was unsure as to where the British would attack. Both Greene and Reed thought that the British would attack Long Island, but Washington felt that a British attack on Long Island might be a diversion for the main attack on Manhattan. He broke his army in half, stationing half of it on Manhattan, and the other half on Long Island; the army on Long Island was commanded by Greene. On August 20, Greene became ill and was forced to move to a house in Manhattan where he rested to recover. John Sullivan was placed in command until Greene was well enough to resume command.

Invasion of Long Island
At 05:10 on August 22, an advance guard of 4,000 British troops left Staten Island under the command of Clinton and Cornwallis to land on Long Island. At 08:00, all 4,000 troops landed unopposed on the shore of Gravesend Bay. Colonel Edward Hand's Pennsylvanian riflemen had been stationed on the shore, but they did not oppose the landings and fell back, killing cattle and burning farmhouses on the way. By noon, 15,000 troops had landed on shore along with 40 pieces of artillery, as hundreds of Loyalists came to greet the British troops. Cornwallis pushed on with the advance guard, advancing six miles onto the island and establishing a camp at the village of Flatbush. He was given orders to advance no further.

Washington received word of the landings the same day but was informed that the number was 8,000 to 9,000 troops. This convinced him that it was the feint that he had predicted and therefore he only sent 1,500 more troops to Brooklyn, bringing the total number of troops on Long Island to 6,000. On August 24, Washington replaced Sullivan with Israel Putnam who commanded the troops on Long Island. Putnam arrived on Long Island the next day along with six battalions. Also that day, the British troops on Long Island received 5,000 Hessian reinforcements, bringing their total to 20,000. There was little fighting on the days immediately after the landing, although some small skirmishes did take place with American marksmen armed with rifles picking off British troops from time to time.

The American plan was for Putnam to direct the defenses from Brooklyn Heights, while Sullivan and Stirling and their troops would be stationed forward on the Guan Heights. The Guan (hills) were up to 150 feet high and blocked the most direct route to Brooklyn Heights. Washington believed that, by stationing men on the heights, heavy casualties could be inflicted on the British before the troops fell back to the main defenses at Brooklyn Heights. There were three main passes through the heights; the Gowanus Road farthest to the west, the Flatbush Road slightly farther to the east, in the center of the American line where it was expected that the British would attack, and the Bedford Pass even further to the east. Stirling was responsible for defending the Gowanus Road with 500 men, and Sullivan was to defend the Flatbush and Bedford roads where there were 1,000 and 800 men respectively. Six-thousand troops were to remain behind at Brooklyn Heights. There was one lesser-known path through the heights called the Jamaica Pass, farthest to the east, which was patrolled by just five militia officers on horseback.

On the British side, General Clinton learned of the almost undefended Jamaica Pass from local Loyalists. He drew up a plan and gave it to William Erskine to propose to Howe. Clinton's plan had the main army making a night march and going through the Jamaica Pass to turn the American flank, while other troops would keep the Americans busy in front. On August 26, Clinton received word from Howe that the plan would be used, and that Clinton was to command the advance guard of the main army of 10,000 men on the march through the Jamaica Pass. While they made the night march, General James Grant's British troops along with some Hessians, a total of 4,000 men, were to attack the Americans in front to distract them from the main army coming on their flank. Howe told Clinton to be ready to move out that night, August 26.

Battle

Night march

At 21:00, the British moved out. No one except the commanders knew of the plan. Clinton led a crack brigade of light infantry with fixed bayonets in front, followed by Cornwallis who had eight battalions and 14 artillery pieces. Cornwallis was followed by Howe and Hugh Percy with six battalions, more artillery, and baggage. The column consisted of 10,000 men who stretched out over two miles. Three Loyalist farmers led the column toward the Jamaica Pass. The British had left their campfires burning to deceive the Americans into thinking that nothing was happening. The column headed northeast until it reached what later became the village of New Lots, when it headed directly north toward the heights.

The column had yet to run into any American troops when they reached Howard's Tavern (also known as "Howard's Half-Way House"), just a few hundred yards from the Jamaica Pass. Tavern keeper William Howard and his son William Jr. were forced to act as guides to show the British the way to the Rockaway Foot Path, an old Indian trail that skirted the Jamaica Pass to the west (located today in the Cemetery of the Evergreens). William Howard Jr. describes meeting Howe:
It was about two in the morning of August 27 that I was awakened by seeing a soldier at the side of my bed. I got up and dressed and went down to the barroom, where I saw my father standing in one corner with three British soldiers before him with muskets and bayonets fixed. The army was then lying in the field in front of the house... General Howe and another officer were in the barroom. General Howe wore a camlet cloak over his regimentals. After asking for a glass of liquor from the bar, which was given him, he entered into familiar conversation with my father, and among other things said, "I must have some one of you to show me over the Rockaway Path around the pass." My father replied, "We belong to the other side, General, and can’t serve you against our duty." General Howe replied, "That is alright; stick to your country, or stick to your principles, but Howard, you are my prisoner and must guide my men over the hill." My father made some further objection, but was silenced by the general, who said, "You have no alternative. If you refuse I shall shoot you through the head.

Five minutes after leaving the tavern, the five American militia officers stationed at the pass were captured without a shot fired, as they thought that the British were Americans. Clinton interrogated the men and they informed him that they were the only troops guarding the pass. By dawn, the British were through the pass and stopped so that the troops could rest. At 09:00, they fired two heavy cannons to signal the Hessian troops below Battle Pass to begin their frontal assault against Sullivan's men deployed on the two hills flanking the pass, while Clinton's troops simultaneously flanked the American positions from the east.

Grant's diversionary attack 
At about 23:00 on August 26, the first shots were fired in the Battle of Long Island, near the Red Lion Inn (near present-day 39th Street and 4th Avenue). American pickets from Samuel John Atlee's Pennsylvania regiment fired upon two British soldiers who were foraging in a watermelon patch near the inn.

Around 01:00 on August 27, the British approached the vicinity of the Red Lion with 200–300 troops. The American troops fired upon the British; after approximately two fusillades, they fled up the Gowanus Road toward the Vechte–Cortelyou House. Major Edward Burd had been in command, but he was captured along with a lieutenant and 15 privates. This first engagement was fought in the vicinity of 38th and 39th streets between 2nd and 3rd avenues near a swamp located adjacent to the Gowanus Road.

Brigadier General Samuel Holden Parsons and Colonel Atlee were stationed farther north on the Gowanus Road. Parsons was a lawyer from Connecticut who had recently secured a commission in the Continental Army; Atlee was a veteran of the French and Indian War in command of the First Regiment of Pennsylvania Musketry. Putnam had been awakened by a guard at 03:00 and told that the British were attacking through the Gowanus Pass. He lit signals to Washington, who was on Manhattan, and then rode south to warn Stirling of the attack.

Stirling led two units of Colonel John Haslet's 1st Delaware Regiment under the immediate command of Major Thomas Macdonough, and Colonel William Smallwood's 1st Maryland Infantry under the immediate command of Major Mordecai Gist; both Haslet and Smallwood were on courts-martial duty in Manhattan. Following close behind was Parson's Connecticut regiment with 251 men. Stirling led this combined force to reinforce Parsons and Atlee and stop the British advance. Stirling had a total of 1,600 troops at his command.

Stirling placed Atlee's men in an apple orchard owned by Wynant Bennett on the south side of the Gowanus Road near present-day 3rd Avenue and 18th Street. Upon the approach of the British, the Americans:
took possession of a hill about two miles from camp, and detached Colonel Atlee to meet them further on the road; in about sixty rods he drew up and received the enemy's fire and gave them a well-directed fire from his regiment, which did great execution, and then retreated to the hill. – General Parsons

Stirling took up positions with the Delaware and Maryland regiments just to the north of Atlee's men on the slopes of a rise of land between 18th and 20th streets. Some of the Maryland troops were positioned on a small hill near today's 23rd Street, which the local Dutch called "Blokje Berg" (Dutch for cube or block hill). At the base of this hill, the Gowanus Road crossed a small bridge over a ditch which drained a marshy area. When the British advanced up the Gowanus Road, the American troops fired upon them from positions on the north side of the ditch. To their left was Colonel Peter Kachline's Pennsylvania regiment.

Just to the southeast of Blokje Berg were a few hills; amongst them was a hill which is the highest point in King's County at 220 feet which came to be known as "Battle Hill," in what is today Greenwood Cemetery by the cemetery's boundary of 23rd Street and 7th Avenue. The British attempted to outflank the American positions by taking this hill. The Americans tried to prevent the British move, sending troops under Parsons and Atlee to take the hill. The British got there first but the Americans were able to dislodge them in fierce fighting. Battle Hill was the site of especially brutal fighting, with the Americans inflicting the highest number of casualties against the British troops during the entire Battle of Long Island. Among those killed was British Colonel James Grant, which led the Americans to believe that they had killed General James Grant. He was alleged to have been shot by a Pennsylvanian rifleman who had been sniping at the British from up in a tree. Among the American dead was Pennsylvania Colonel Caleb Parry, who was killed while rallying his troops.

The Americans were still unaware that this was not the main British attack, in part due to the ferocity of the fighting and the number of British troops engaged.

Battle Pass

The Hessians, in the center under the command of General von Heister, began to bombard the American lines stationed at Battle Pass under the command of General John Sullivan. The Hessian brigades did not attack, as they were waiting for the pre-arranged signal from the British, who were in the process of outflanking the American lines at that time. The Americans were still under the assumption that Grant's attack up the Gowanus Road was the main thrust, and Sullivan sent four hundred of his men to reinforce Stirling.

Howe fired his signal guns at 09:00 and the Hessians began to attack up Battle Pass, while the main army came at Sullivan from the rear. Sullivan left his advance guard to hold off the Hessians while he turned the rest of his force around to fight the British. Heavy casualties mounted between the Americans and the British, and men on both sides fled out of fear. Sullivan attempted to calm his men and tried to lead a retreat. By this point, the Hessians had overrun the advance guard on the heights and the American left had completely collapsed. Hand-to-hand fighting followed, with the Americans swinging their muskets and rifles like clubs to save their own lives. It was later claimed, Americans who surrendered were bayoneted by the Hessians. Sullivan, despite the chaos, managed to evacuate most of his men to Brooklyn Heights though he himself was captured.

Vechte–Cortelyou House 

At 09:00, Washington arrived from Manhattan. He realized that he had been wrong about a feint on Long Island and he ordered more troops to Brooklyn from Manhattan. His location on the battlefield is not known because accounts differ, but most likely he was at Brooklyn Heights where he could view the battle.

Stirling still held the line against Grant on the American right, to the west. He held on for four hours, still unaware of the British flanking maneuver, and some of his own troops thought that they were winning the day because the British had been unable to take their position. However, Grant was reinforced by 2,000 marines, and he hit Stirling's center by 11:00, and Stirling was attacked on his left by the Hessians. Stirling pulled back, but British troops were coming at him from the rear, from the south up the Gowanus Road. The only escape route left was across Brouwer's millpond on the Gowanus Creek which was 80 yards wide, where the American defenses on Brooklyn Heights lay on the other side.

Maryland 400
Stirling ordered all of his troops to cross the creek, except a contingent of Maryland troops under the command of Gist. This group became known to history as the "Maryland 400", although they numbered about 260–270 men. Stirling and Gist led the troops in a rear-guard action against the overwhelming numbers of British troops, which surpassed 2,000 supported by two cannons. Stirling and Gist led the Marylanders in two attacks against the British, who were in fixed positions inside and in front of the Vechte–Cortelyou House (known today as the "Old Stone House"). After the last assault, the remaining troops retreated across the Gowanus Creek. Some of the men who tried to cross the marsh were bogged down in the mud and under musket fire, and others who could not swim were captured. Stirling was surrounded and, unwilling to surrender to the British, broke through their lines to von Heister's Hessians and surrendered to them. Two hundred fifty six Maryland troops were killed in the assaults in front of the Old Stone House, and fewer than a dozen made it back to the American lines. Washington watched from a redoubt on nearby Cobble Hill (intersection of today's Court Street and Atlantic Avenue) and reportedly said, "Good God, what brave fellows I must this day lose."

Disengagement 
The American troops who were not killed or captured escaped behind the fortified American positions centered on Brooklyn Heights. Howe then ordered all of his troops to halt the attack, despite the protests of many officers in his command who believed that they should push on to Brooklyn Heights. Howe had decided against a direct frontal assault on the entrenched American positions, choosing instead to begin a siege and setting up lines of circumvallation around the American positions. He believed the Americans to be essentially trapped, with his troops blocking escape by land and the Royal Navy in control of the East River, which they would have to cross to reach Manhattan Island.

Howe's failure to press the attack and the reasons for it have been disputed. He may have wished to avoid the casualties that his army suffered when attacking the Continentals under similar circumstances at the Battle of Bunker Hill. He may also have been giving Washington an opportunity to conclude that his position was hopeless and surrender, in the European gentleman-officer tradition. Howe told Parliament in 1779 that his essential duty was to avoid excessive British casualties for insufficient purpose, and capturing Brooklyn Heights would likely not have meant capturing the entire American army. "The most essential duty I had to observe was, not wantonly to commit his majesty's troops, where the object was inadequate. I knew well that any considerable loss sustained by the army could not speedily, nor easily, be repaired. . . . The loss of 1,000, or perhaps 1,500 British troops, in carrying those lines, would have been but ill repaid by double that number of the enemy, could it have been supposed they would have suffered in that proportion."

Aftermath

Retreat to Manhattan

Washington and the army were surrounded on Brooklyn Heights with the East River to their backs. As the day went on, the British began to dig trenches, slowly coming closer to the American defenses. By doing this, the British would not have to cross over open ground to assault the American defenses as they did in Boston the year before. Despite this perilous situation, Washington ordered 1,200 more men from Manhattan to Brooklyn on August 28. The men that came over were two Pennsylvania regiments and Colonel John Glover's regiment from Marblehead, Massachusetts. In command of the Pennsylvanian troops was Thomas Mifflin who, after arriving, volunteered to inspect the outer defenses and report back to Washington. In these outer defenses, small skirmishes were still taking place. On the afternoon of August 28, it began to rain and Washington had his cannons bombard the British well into the night.

As the rain continued, George Washington sent a letter instructing General William Heath, who was at Kings Bridge over the Harlem River between Manhattan and what is now the Bronx, to send every flat-bottomed boat and sloop without delay, in case battalions of infantry from New Jersey came to reinforce their position. At 16:00, on August 29, Washington held a meeting with his generals. Mifflin advised Washington to retreat to Manhattan while Mifflin and his Pennsylvania regiments made up the rear guard, holding the line until the rest of the army had withdrawn. The generals agreed unanimously with Mifflin that retreat was the best option and Washington had orders go out by the evening.

The troops were told that they were to gather up all their ammunition and baggage and prepare for a night attack. By 21:00, the sick and wounded began to move to the Brooklyn Ferry in preparation for evacuation. At 23:00, Glover and his Massachusetts men, who were sailors and fishermen, began to evacuate the troops.

As more troops were evacuated, more were ordered to withdraw from the lines and march to the ferry landing. Wagon wheels were muffled, and men were forbidden to talk. Mifflin's rear guard was tending campfires to deceive the British. At 04:00, on August 30, Mifflin was informed that it was his unit's turn to evacuate. Mifflin told the man who had been sent to order him to leave, Major Alexander Scammell, that he must be mistaken, but Scammell insisted that he was not and Mifflin ordered his troops to move out. When Mifflin's troops were within a half mile of the ferry landing, Washington rode up and demanded to know why they were not at their defenses. Edward Hand, who was leading the troops, tried to explain what had happened, but Mifflin arrived shortly. Washington exclaimed "Good God. General Mifflin, I am afraid you have ruined us." Mifflin explained that he had been told that it was his turn to evacuate by Scammell; Washington told him it had been a mistake. Mifflin then led his troops back to the outer defenses.

Artillery, supplies, and troops were all being evacuated across the river at this time but it was not going as fast as Washington had anticipated and daybreak soon came. A fog settled in and concealed the evacuation from the British. British patrols noticed that there did not seem to be any American pickets and thus began to search the area. While they were doing this, Washington, the last man left, stepped onto the last boat. At 07:00, the last American troops landed in Manhattan. All 9,000 troops had been evacuated with no loss of life.

Conclusion of the campaign

The British were stunned to find that Washington and the army had escaped. Later in the day, August 30, the British troops occupied the American fortifications. When news of the battle reached London, it caused many festivities to take place. Bells were rung across the city, candles were lit in windows and King George III gave Howe the Order of the Bath.

Washington's defeat, in the opinions of some, revealed his deficiencies as a strategist, because of how he split his forces. His inexperienced generals misunderstood the situation, and his raw troops fled in disorder at the first shots. However, his daring nighttime retreat has been seen by some historians as one of his greatest military feats. Other historians concentrate on the failure of British naval forces to prevent the withdrawal.

Howe remained inactive for the next half month, not attacking until September 15 when he landed a force at Kip's Bay. The British quickly occupied the city. Although American troops delivered an unexpected check to the British at Harlem Heights in mid-September, Howe defeated Washington in battle again at White Plains and then again at Fort Washington. Because of these defeats, Washington and the army retreated across New Jersey and into Pennsylvania. On September 21, a fire of uncertain origin destroyed a quarter of New York City. In the immediate aftermath of the fire Nathan Hale was executed for spying.

Casualties

At the time, it was by far the largest battle ever fought in North America. If the Royal Navy is included, over 40,000 men took part in the battle. Howe reported his losses as 59 killed, 268 wounded and 31 missing. The Hessian casualties were 5 killed and 26 wounded. The Americans suffered much heavier losses. About 300 had been killed and over 1,000 captured. As few as half of the prisoners survived. Kept on prison ships in Wallabout Bay, then transferred to locations such as the Middle Dutch Church, they were starved and denied medical attention. In their weakened condition, many succumbed to smallpox.

Historians believe that as many as 256 soldiers of the First Maryland Regiment under Colonel William Smallwood fell in the battle, about two-thirds of the regiment. It is known that they were buried in a mass-grave, but the grave's exact location has been a mystery for 240 years.

Legacy

The most significant legacy of the Battle of Long Island was that it showed there would be no easy victory, and that the war would be long and bloody. The British took control of the strategically vital harbor and put New York City under military occupation until the treaty ending the war was signed. With the British military command in residence the city became the focal point for espionage and intelligence gathering. The area surrounding the city and the harbor remained in a near-constant state of conflict as a forage-war harassed the surrounding communities.

Commemorations of the battle include:
 The Altar to Liberty: Minerva monument: The battle is commemorated with a monument, which includes a bronze statue of Minerva near the top of Battle Hill, the highest point of Brooklyn, in Green-Wood Cemetery. The statue was sculpted by Frederick Ruckstull and unveiled in 1920. The statue stands in the northwest corner of the cemetery and gazes directly at the Statue of Liberty in New York Harbor. In 2006, the Minerva statue was invoked in a successful defense to prevent a building from blocking the line of sight from the cemetery to the Statue of Liberty in the harbor. The annual Battle of Long Island commemoration begins inside the main Gothic arch entrance to Green-Wood Cemetery and marches up Battle Hill to ceremonies at the monument.
 The Prison Ship Martyrs' Monument: A freestanding Doric column in Fort Greene memorializing all those who died while kept prisoner on the British ships just off the shore of Brooklyn, in Wallabout Bay.
 Soldiers' Monument – Milford, Connecticut. Memorializes the 200 seriously ill prisoners of the Battle of Long Island who were dumped on the beach at Milford the night of January 3, 1777.
 The Old Stone House: A re-constructed farmhouse (c.1699) that was at the center of the Marylanders' delaying actions serves as a museum of the battle. It is located in J.J. Byrne Park, at Third Street and Fifth Avenue, Brooklyn, and features models and maps.
 Prospect Park, Brooklyn, Battle Pass: along the eastern side of East Drive is a large granite boulder with a brass plaque affixed, and another marker lies near the road for the Dongan Oak, a very large and old tree felled to block the pass from the British advance. In addition, in the park resides the Line of Defense marker erected by the Sons of the American Revolution and, near the eastern edge of Long Meadow, the Maryland Monument & Maryland Memorial corinthian column.

There are only thirty currently existing units in the U.S. Army with lineages that go back to the colonial and revolutionary eras.  Five Army National Guard units (101st Eng Bn, 125th MP Co, 175th Inf, 181st Inf and 198th Sig Bn) and one Regular Army Field Artillery battalion (1–5th FA) are derived from American units that participated in the Battle of Long Island.

See also

 List of American Revolutionary War battles
 American Revolutionary War §British New York counter-offensive. The ‘Battle of Long Island’ placed in overall sequence and strategic context.
 Dr. John Hart, Regimental Surgeon of Col Prescott's Regiment who was stationed at Governor's Island
 Long Island order of battle
 New York and New Jersey campaign

References

Notes

Citations

Bibliography

External links

  Whittimore, Henry "The Heroes of the American Revolution and their Descendants; The Battle of Long Island" 1897
 The Wild Geese Today – Honoring Those Who Saved Washington's Army 
 Website on Battle of Long Island
 "The Old Stone House" museum
 Howe's defense of his actions to Parliament in spring 1779
 New York Guard 1/9th Battalion

1776 in the United States
Conflicts in 1776
Long Island
Long Island
Long Island
Long Island
Military history of New York City
18th century in Brooklyn
1776 in New York (state)
South Brooklyn